The Army Recruiting and Initial Training Command (ARITC) is a two-star command of the British Army and "is responsible for all recruiting, selection, and basic training of soldiers and the recruitment and selection of officers".

History 
Army 2020 was the name given to the restructuring of the British Army, in light of the 2010 Strategic Defence and Security Review.

On 1 April 2018, the Army Recruiting and Training Division was disbanded.  Before this date, the division (a major-general's command) was tasked with everything from recruiting to initial training to second-level training.  The division at this time also controlled the Land Warfare Centre.  However, following the Army 2020 Refine, the division was disestablished with the recruiting and initial training given to the new 'Army Recruiting and Initial Training Command', while the second-level and further training given to the Land Warfare Centre.  The latter of which is now under direct control of Commander Field Army.

Since its formation, the command has been under control of Home Command.

Structure 
Army Recruiting and Initial Training Command was established on 1 April 2018.  The Commander of this formation is a 2-star Major General.

 Army Recruiting and Initial Training Command, at Trenchard Lines, Upavon
 Director General, Army Recruiting and Initial Training Command, a Major General
 Commandant, School of Infantry
 Commandant, Initial Training Group
 Commandant, Royal School of Military Engineering
 Director Recruit Training (Operations)
 Director Recruit Training (Support)
 Director Training (Army)
 Defence College of Logistics and Personnel Administration
 Army Adventurous Training Group (Army)
 Initial Training Group, at Trenchard Lines, Upavon – commanded by a brigadier
 Army Foundation College, Harrogate
 Army School of Physical Training
 Army Recruiting and Initial Training Centre Staff Leadership School
 Army Training Centre, Pirbright
 Army Training Regiment, Winchester
 Army Training Regiment, Grantham
 Army Training Unit North, at Queen Elizabeth Barracks, Strensall
 Army Training Unit Northern Ireland, at Abercorn Barracks, Ballykinler
 Army Training Unit Scotland, at Redford Barracks, Edinburgh
 Army Training Unit West, at Maindy Barracks, Cardiff
 Detachment, at Wyvern Barracks, Exeter
 Army Recruiting Group
 Outreach Team South West, at Wyvern Barracks, Exeter
 School of Infantry, at Vimy Barracks, Catterick Garrison
 Infantry Training Centre, at Helles Barracks, Catterick Garrison
 1st Infantry Training Battalion
 2nd Infantry Training Battalion
 Infantry Training Centre Support Battalion
 Army School of Ceremonial
 Army School of Bagpipe Music and Highland Drumming, at Redford Barracks, Edinburgh
 400 Troop, Royal Logistic Corps
 Parachute Training Support Unit (PTSU), at RAF Brize Norton
 Pegasus Company
 Infantry Battle School, at Dering Lines, Brecon
 Gurkha Company (Mandalay)
 Specialist Weapons School, at Waterloo Lines, Warminster Garrison
 Royal School of Military Engineering, at Brompton Barracks, Chatham Station
 1st Royal School of Military Engineering Regiment, Royal Engineers
 3rd Royal School of Military Engineering Regiment, Royal Engineers, at Gibraltar Barracks, Minley
 Professional Engineer Wing
 Royal Engineer Warfare Wing, at Gibraltar Barracks, Minley
 Defence Animal Training Regiment, Royal Army Veterinary Corps, at the Defence Animal Training Centre, Melton Mowbray
 Defence Explosive Ordnance Disposal, Munitions and Search Training Regiment, at MoD Bicester, Bicester
 Royal Military School of Music, at Kneller Hall, Twickenham
 Defence Chemical, Biological, Radiological and Nuclear Centre, in Winterbourne Gunner

Commanders
Commanders have been:
 Major-General Paul Nanson (2018–2020)
 Major-General Sharon Nesmith (2021–2022)

Footnotes 

Military units and formations established in 2018
Commands of the British Army
Training establishments of the British Army
Army training units and formations